José González or Jose Gonzalez may refer to:

Arts 
José Luis González (writer) (1926–1996), Puerto Rican writer of Dominican descent
Jose B. Gonzalez (born 1967), Hispanic American poet and educator
José González (singer) (born 1978), Swedish-Argentinian singer-songwriter
José González (artist) (1939–2009), Spanish comic book artist
Jose Luis Gonzalez (artist), American designer, painter, muralist, sculptor, restorer, ceramist, importer, and arts administrator
José Luis González (composer) (born 1937), Mexican composer

Law and politics
Jose Alejandro Gonzalez Jr. (born 1931), American judge 
José Antonio González i Casanova (1935–2021), Spanish jurist
José Emilio González Velázquez, Puerto Rican senator and attorney
José Gonzalez (French politician) French politician from the National Rally
José González Morfin (born 1954), Mexican politician
José González Ortiz, Puerto Rican politician and former mayor of Luquillo
José Maldonado González (1901–1985), last president of the Spanish Republican government in Exile
José Soberanis González (born 1946), Mexican politician
José González Valencia (born 1975), Mexican suspected high-ranking drug lord

Sports

Association football
José González (Chilean footballer) (born 1939), Chilean football player and manager
José Luis González Dávila (1942–1995), Mexican football player
José González Ganoza (1954–1987), Peruvian footballer
José Luis González China (born 1966), Mexican football player and manager
José González (footballer, born 1966), Spanish football player and manager
José Francisco González (born 1971), Venezuelan footballer
José Joel González (born 1979), Mexican footballer for Atlante F.C.
José Manuel González (footballer) (born 1981), Salvadoran footballer
José González (footballer, born 1991), Panamanian footballer
José González (footballer, born 1998), Mexican footballer for Tapatío
José González (footballer, born 2004), Mexican footballer for UNAM

Baseball
José González (baseball) (born 1964), MLB outfielder
José Estrada González (born 1967), Cuban baseball player and Olympic gold medalist

Shooting
José González (Spanish sport shooter) (1907–?), Spanish Olympic shooter
José González (Puerto Rican sport shooter) (born 1925), Puerto Rican Olympic shooter
José González (Cuban sport shooter) (born 1947), Cuban Olympic shooter
José González (Mexican sport shooter) (born 1948), Mexican Olympic shooter

Swimming
José González (Puerto Rican swimmer) (born 1977), Puerto Rican swimmer
José González (Spanish swimmer) (1906-1997), Spanish Olympic swimmer

Other sports
José González (basketball) (born 1914), Chilean Olympic basketball player
José González (equestrian) (born 1917), Mexican Olympic equestrian
José Froilán González (1922–2013), Argentinean racing driver
José González (wrestler) (born 1946), Puerto Rican professional wrestler
José González (gymnast) (born 1946), Mexican Olympic gymnast
José Luis González (runner) (born 1957), Spanish middle and long-distance runner
José Manuel González (athlete) (born 1970), Paralympic athlete from Spain
José González García (born 1973), Mexican chess grandmaster
José González (sprinter) (born 1997), Spanish sprinter

Others
José Emilio González (1918–1990), Puerto Rican critic and editor
José Manuel González Paramo (born 1958), Spanish economist
José González-Lander (1933–2000), Venezuelan engineer
José Eleuterio González (1813–1888), Mexican physician and philanthropist
José Ramón González, Puerto Rican businessman
José González Rubio (1804–1875), Roman Catholic friar

See also
Ambrosio José Gonzales (1818-1893), Cuban revolutionary general
José Antonio González (disambiguation)
José Luis González (disambiguation)